Valeh may refer to:

 Valeh, Alborz (وله - Valeh)
 Valeh, Mazandaran (واله - Vāleh)

See also
 Vale (disambiguation)